End of the Dialogue (Phelandaba)  is a 1970 documentary film made by five black South African expatriate members of the Pan-Africanist Congress and London film students who wanted to document Apartheid in South Africa. Because of South Africa's restrictive laws governing what could be photographed, the film had to be shot clandestinely and smuggled out of the country. It was edited and released in England.

The film caused an uproar when it was originally released in 1970. It was released worldwide and also screened on television in many countries, including the U.S., U.K. and New Zealand. The film is valuable as not only a record of history, but also a record of how little the outside world understood about what was happening in apartheid South Africa. The London Observer called it, "the most successful act of clandestine subversion against apartheid for years."

Awards
1970 Catholic Film Workers Prize
Golden Dove Award, 1970 Leipzig Film Festival (Germany)
Golden Squirrel Award, Netherlands Film Institute
Inter-Film Jury Prize and the Volkshoch-Schule Jury Prize, 1970 Oberhausen Film Festival (Germany)
1970 Moscow Film Festival
1971 Emmy Award
2003 African Studies Association Conference Film Festival

References

External links
End of the Dialogue at Icarus Films

1970 films
1970 documentary films
South African documentary films
1970s English-language films